Guy Carleton may refer to:

Guy Carleton (bishop) (1605–1685), Anglican bishop
Guy Carleton, 1st Baron Dorchester (1724–1808), Irish soldier and early Governor of Canada
Guy Carleton (general), (1857–1946), United States Army major general

See also
Guy Carleton Wiggins (1883–1962), American landscape painter